Donna Oghenenyerovwo Adja (also known as Donna Diva), is a Nigerian performer and actress. She is Nigeria's first female record producer.

Background and education 
Adja is from Eku in Ethiope East, Delta State. She had her primary education in Adams Iweh Primary School and her secondary education in Baptist High School; both in her hometown in Delta state. She went on to attain a degree in Business Management from Obafemi Awolowo University (OAU), Ile Ife.

Career 
She started singing at the age of fifteen; in her local church choir. She went on to become the lead singer of the in-house band of the Sheraton Lagos Hotel. She quit the role in 2011 to begin a solo career as a recording artiste.

In 2012, she released her debut single titled Shut Up. The video was shot by Clarence Peters. She released the audio and video to her song Gaga in 2013. The video was shot by Mattmax. The video was themed after the 2009 Hollywood movie Avatar. In an interview with P.M. News, she revealed that she spent over five million naira shooting the video to Gaga, as shehad to shoot the video and redesign costumes twice. She followed up with the release of the song Super Love. The video to the song was self-directed. In 2013 she was one of the performing artistes at her friend - Cool FM OAP Do2tun's - Bachelor's night, alongside Ice Prince, M.I Abaga, Sean Tizzle, Chidinma, KCee, Iyanya, Vector, DJ Xclusive, Olamide, DJ Spinall, AY Makun and Dammy Krane. She took a hiatus from the Nigerian movie industry, moving to Los Angeles. She had a couple of cameo appearances in a few Hollywood movies. She returned to the Nigerian music scene and released the track Breathe in memory of George Floyd, an African American man who was gruesomely killed by a police officer, choking him to death by pressing his knee on the victim's neck. In 2022 with the song Ganja. 

She was featured by The Sun as one of the 100 Most Influential African Women in the Music Industry.

She had a brief stint in Nigerian movie industry, Nollywood, but left due to politicking and sexual harassment.

Discography 
 Shut Up (2012)
 Gaga (2013)
 Breathe (2022)
 Super Love (2014)
 My Oga (2014)
 Wakanda Forever
 Oghene Do
 Hello
 I Like Your Body
 Ganja (2022)

Personal life 
She got an Audi A6 as a birthday gift from her fans in 2013.

References

External links 
 

Nigerian women pop singers
 Obafemi Awolowo University alumni
Musicians from Delta State
Living people
Nigerian rhythm and blues singers
Urhobo people
 People from Delta State
English-language singers from Nigeria
21st-century Nigerian women singers
Nigerian women singer-songwriters
Year of birth missing (living people)